The Waino Tanttari Field Hay Barn is a barn built with traditional Finnish log construction in Waasa Township, Minnesota, United States.  It was built in 1935 by Finnish American farmer Waino Tanttari, and stands in isolation a quarter mile from the main cluster of buildings on the farmstead.  The Tanttari Barn was listed on the National Register of Historic Places in 1990 for its state-level significance in the theme of agriculture.  It was nominated for reflecting the successful conversion of northeastern Minnesota's cutover forests into farmland by late-19th and early-20th-century Finnish American settlers.

It has a hay hood.

See also
 National Register of Historic Places listings in St. Louis County, Minnesota

References

1935 establishments in Minnesota
Barns on the National Register of Historic Places in Minnesota
Barns with hay hoods
Buildings and structures completed in 1935
Buildings and structures in St. Louis County, Minnesota
Finnish-American culture in Minnesota
Log buildings and structures on the National Register of Historic Places in Minnesota
National Register of Historic Places in St. Louis County, Minnesota